Lava Island Falls are rapids on the Deschutes River. Rated a Class 5, they are difficult to navigate because of an island of lava from Lava Butte that blocked part of the river.

References

External links
 http://www.waterfallswest.com/waterfall.php?id=114
 http://www.trails.com/tcatalog_trail.aspx?trailid=CGW008-190
 http://www.waterfallsnorthwest.com/nws/waterfall.php?num=2290

Waterfalls of Oregon
Waterfalls of Deschutes County, Oregon